A three-wheeler or three-wheeled vehicle is a vehicle with three wheels.

Three-wheeler or three-wheeled vehicle may also refer to:
 Three-wheeled all-terrain vehicle
 Three-wheeled motor scooter
 Three-wheeled steam tank
 Tilting three-wheeler

See also
 Rickshaw (disambiguation)#Vehicles
 Trike (disambiguation)#Vehicles with three wheels
 Tricycle (disambiguation)#Vehicles with three wheels